Kostelec nad Vltavou is a municipality and village in Písek District in the South Bohemian Region of the Czech Republic. It has about 400 inhabitants.

Administrative parts

Villages of Přílepov, Sobědraž and Zahrádka are administrative parts of Kostelec nad Vltavou.

References

Villages in Písek District